The A4042 is a trunk road that runs from Abergavenny to Newport in south Wales.

Route
Starting at the junction of the A40 and A465 south of Abergavenny, the A4042 travels south towards Little Mill north of Pontypool. This section is a single carriageway and is winding and undulating. From Little Mill onwards the road is dual carriageway, bypassing Pontypool and Cwmbran before crossing the city boundary into Newport. The road has a junction (25A) with the M4 motorway and south from there loses its primary status and becomes an urban road. The first section of which, Heidenheim Drive (named after one of Newport's twin towns), is an elevated roadway through the Crindau district. The road then becomes the Kingsway that passes through Newport city centre, and continues on as Usk Way until its junction with the A48 Southern Distributor Road to the south of Newport.

Junctions

{| class="wikitable"
|- align="center" bgcolor="#00703C" style="color: #ffd200;font-size:120%;"
| colspan="3" | A4042
|- align="center" 
!scope=col| Northbound exits
!scope=col| Junction
!scope=col| Southbound exits
|- align='center'
| Merthyr Tydfil, Hereford A465  Abergavenny, Brecon, Monmouth A40
| Ysbytty Fields Roundabout
| Start of A4042
|- align='center'
| Llanfoist B4269
| Llanellen Junction
| Llanfoist B4269
|- align='center'
| Usk A472
| Little Mill Junction
| Usk, Little Mill A472
|- align='center'
| Mamhilad
| Mamhilad Roundabout
| Mamhilad
|- align='center'
| New Inn
| New Inn Roundabout
| New Inn
|- align='center'
| Pontypool A472 (A4043)
| Pontymoile Roundabout
| Pontypool A472 (A4043)
|- align='center'
| Cwmbran A4051  New Inn
| Craig-y- Felin
| New Inn  Cwmbran A4051
|- align='center'
| Croesyceiliog
| Croesyceiliog Roundabout
| Croesyceiliog
|- align='center'
| Croesyceiliog  Caerleon B4236
| Turnpike Roundabout
| Caerleon B4236
|- align='center'
| Llantarnam  Cwmbran
| Crown Roundabout
| Llantarnam  Cwmbran
|- align='center'
| Cwmbran A4051
| Croes-y-Mwyalch
| Cardiff A4051 (M4 (W))
|- align='center'
| Start of A4042
| Grove Park
| London, Chepstow A4042 (M4 (E))
|- align="center" bgcolor="white" style="color: black;font-size:120%;" style="font-size:120%; border-top: black 2px solid;"
| colspan=3 | A4042
|- 
! Northbound exits
! Junction / Interchange
! Southbound exits
|- align='center'
| London, Chepstow A4042 (M4 (E))  Caerleon B4596
| Grove Park 
| Start of A4042
|- align='center'
| Cardiff A4051 (M4 (W))
| Harlequin
| Cardiff A4051 (M4 (W))  City Centre 
|- align='center'
| Civic Centre B4591  Exit only
| Old Green Interchange
| Access only 
|- align='center'
| Cattle market  Old Town Docks
| Octopus Bridge
| Old Town Docks  Superstore
|- align='center'
| Start of A4042
| Old Town Dock
| (M4 (E)), Pilgwenlly, Docks, (M4 (W)) A48

See also
Trunk roads in Wales

References

External links
 

Roads in Monmouthshire
Roads in Torfaen
Roads in Newport, Wales